Guyana competed at the 1996 Summer Olympics in Atlanta, United States.

Athletics

Men
Track & road events

Women
Field events

Boxing

See also
Guyana at the 1995 Pan American Games

References
Official Olympic Reports

Nations at the 1996 Summer Olympics
1996 Summer Olympics
Olympics